Mehruiyeh or Mehrueeyeh may refer to:
 Mehruiyeh-ye Bala
 Mehruiyeh-ye Pain
 Mehruiyeh Rural District